Dovie Beams Villagran (born Dovie Leona Osborne, 5 August 1932 – 30 December 2017) was an American actress, best known for having an illicit sexual affair with former Filipino President Ferdinand Marcos from 1968 to 1970.

Early life
Dovie Beams was the daughter of Theodore Halems Osborne (1909—1975) and Mildred Esther Jakes (1913—2002).

Beams had first married and later divorced Edward Walker Boehms (1925—2016). She was granted a divorce due to irreconcilable differences in 1962. They had one child together on 24 September 1955, a daughter named Dena Boehms Walters.

After the sexual affair and scandal that ensued in the Philippines, Beams started her own real estate agency in Glendale, California, and married her second husband, Sergio Fausto Villagran (born 1936). They divorced in 1988.

Recorded sexual affair with Ferdinand Marcos Sr. 
In 1970, a huge scandal hit the Philippines over the stormy break-up between then President Ferdinand Marcos and his mistress of two years, Hollywood starlet Dovie Beams. On many occasions, she had hidden a tape recorder under a bed while having sex with the president.

The recording of their sexual encounter was publicly played at the radio station of the University of the Philippines and consisted of the following segments:

 Breathing and moaning sounds of Ferdinand Marcos 
 Act of physically moving while in the bed as stated by Ferdinand Marcos 
 Verbally declaring “I will kiss you” as Beams giggled in return
 A plea to Beams (interpreted to be allegedly  for performing oral sex)
 Ferdinand Marcos singing the Ilocano folk song “Pamulinawen” to Beams as a gesture of serenade.

Beams had arrived in the Philippines in 1968 to shoot the film Maharlika, a film partially funded by Marcos and meant to glorify his alleged war exploits, in which she played opposite Paul Burke as a native Filipina. Before leaving the country, Beams held a press conference, and delighted the press and public by playing recordings of her trysts with Marcos. According to her, she was forced to publicize her "love affair" as "protection" since there were many threats to her life.

American historian Sterling Seagrave opines the following regarding the tapes:

According to Herminio Rotea
Philippine author Hermie Rotea wrote in his book on the scandal that Beams, besides weakening Marcos' status, had had a positive influence of empowering modern women in Philippine society:

Criminal arrest  
In November 1987, Beams and her husband Sergio Villagran were arrested in Los Angeles County for committing bank fraud related to her real estate agency for the purpose of maintaining their luxurious lifestyle in Pasadena, California.

On 18 December 1987, Beams was given an eight-year sentence in prison while Villagran received a five-year sentence.  Attorney Mr. James Ian Stang at the Los Angeles Superior Court  testified for the prosecution.

Later years and death
On 7 October 2013, Imelda Marcos declared on a public televised interview with TV presenter Solita Monsod that Beams was innocent of her sexual encounter with Ferdinand Marcos Sr. She also alleged that Beams was ultimately used by foreign American agents as an indirect spy to disrupt the health and stability of her husband. Imelda Marcos also stated that she "pitied" Beams for being caught in the public scandal that ensued prior to her leaving the Philippines.

Journalist George Sison narrated how Imelda Marcos confronted Ferdinand Marcos Sr. one night after getting a tape that included audio recordings of Beams and Ferdinand Marcos Sr. having sex:

On 30 December 2017, Beams died in Nashville, Tennessee due to lung cancer and comorbidity, associated with both alcohol and long—term tobacco use.

Filmography

References

External links

1932 births
2017 deaths
American film actresses
Ferdinand Marcos